Sahandabad Rural District is in Tekmeh Dash District of Bostanabad County, East Azerbaijan province, Iran. At the census of 2006, its population was 2,862 in 610 households; there were 2,760 inhabitants in 789 households at the following census of 2011; and in the most recent census of 2016, the population of the rural district was 2,101 in 575 households. The largest of its 27 villages was Qarah Chay-ye Hajj Ali, with 407 people.

References 

Bostanabad County

Rural Districts of East Azerbaijan Province

Populated places in East Azerbaijan Province

Populated places in Bostanabad County